Fraternitatis Rosae Crucis may refer to:
 Ancient Mystical Order Rosae Crucis
 Fraternitas Rosae Crucis
 Rosicrucian